Anastasius II of Antioch, also known as Anastasius the Younger, succeeded Anastasius of Antioch as Eastern Orthodox Patriarch of Antioch, in 599. 

Anastasius is known for his opposition and suppression of simony in his diocese, with the support of Pope Gregory the Great.

In 609 Anastasius is said to have been assassinated during an uprising of Syrian Jews, who were under threat of forced conversion to Christianity. Local Monophysites were also engaged in a revolt at the time. It is possible that they committed the assassination, rather than the Jews. 

Anastasius is one of the 140 Colonnade saints which adorn St. Peter's Square.

References

609 deaths
Syrian Christian saints
Greek Orthodox Patriarchs of Antioch
6th-century Byzantine bishops
7th-century Byzantine bishops
7th-century Christian martyrs
Year of birth unknown
6th-century archbishops
7th-century archbishops